Margaret Markvardt (born 1 April 2000) is an Estonian backstroke, butterfly, freestyle and medley swimmer. She is 28-time long course and 22-time short course Estonian swimming champion. She has broken 12 Estonian records in swimming, including relay races. 

In 2018, she competed in the girls' 50 metre backstroke event at the 2018 Summer Youth Olympics held in Buenos Aires, Argentina. She did not qualify to compete in the semi-finals.

Personal
His father is a retired nordic combined skier Ago.

References

2000 births
Living people
Estonian female backstroke swimmers
Estonian female butterfly swimmers
Estonian female freestyle swimmers
Estonian female medley swimmers
Swimmers from Tallinn
Swimmers at the 2018 Summer Youth Olympics
European Games competitors for Estonia
Swimmers at the 2015 European Games
21st-century Estonian women